U.S. Highway 191 (US 191) is a north-south United States Numbered Highway in the state of Montana.

Route description 
US 191 in Montana begins at the West Entrance to Yellowstone National Park concurrent with US 20 and US 287, at the edge of the town of West Yellowstone. Some commercially produced maps show US 191 going through Yellowstone National Park; however, it officially has a gap inside the park and resumes in Wyoming at the South Entrance. A few blocks into West Yellowstone, US 20 leaves the US 191 / US 287 concurrency and heads west toward the Targhee Pass and Idaho. The route travels northward through the narrow canyon, past the resort community of Big Sky, then entering the Gallatin Valley near the town of Gallatin Gateway. US 191 travels north and east through the valley to the city of Bozeman, which is the largest city along the entire US 191 route.

From Bozeman, US 191 is concurrent with I-90 eastward  to Big Timber, where it proceeds north. The road travels through hilly ranch country near the eastern edge of the Crazy Mountains to Harlowton, where US 191 is briefly concurrent with US 12.

US 191 continues north after going through Lewistown, crossing the Missouri River at the Charles M. Russell National Wildlife Refuge, and through Malta, where it shares a brief concurrency with US 2. It ends at the Canada–United States border at Morgan, where the road continues into Saskatchewan as Highway 4 toward Swift Current.

History
The routing of US 191 has drastically changed through the years, with original route designated in 1926 ran from Idaho Falls, Idaho, to West Yellowstone concurrent with US 20, which existed until 1981 when US 191 rerouted to its current alignment through Wyoming, Utah, and Arizona. 

On February 1, 1935, US 191 was extended over Montana Highway 187 (also known as the Gallatin Way) to Bozeman. 

In 1996, US 191 was extended from Malta the Canadian border, absorbing former Montana Secondary Highway 242.

Major intersections

See also

References

External links

1 in Montana
191
Transportation in Gallatin County, Montana
Transportation in Park County, Montana
Transportation in Park County, Wyoming
Transportation in Sweet Grass County, Montana
Transportation in Wheatland County, Montana
Transportation in Cascade County, Montana
Transportation in Phillips County, Montana